Baheira Airfield, or Bir El Baheira is an abandoned military airfield in Libya, which is located in the eastern desert near the Egypt–Libya border, about 48 km west of Bardīyah; 3 km west of Bi'r al Buhayrah.

Apparently  a prewar Italian Air Force (Regia Aeronautica) airfield, it was used by the Royal Air Force in the early part of the Eastern Desert Campaign.   Driven from the airfield by advancing Afrika Corps units in 1942, it was used by the Luftwaffe in support of Rommel's drive into Egypt.   The Germans were driven out after the Second Battle of El Alamein by the British Eighth Army,  it was then used by the United States Army Air Force as a heavy bomber base by IX Bomber Command. 98th Bombardment Group, which flew B-24 Liberators from the field between 29  January and 14 February 1943.

When the Americans moved out, the base was abandoned.   Today the airfield exists in the desert, relatively intact despite the rages of time and the harsh desert climate.  Twin runways are clearly visible, along with the round perimeter track and many dispersal hardstands.   Parking ramps are clearly in evidence, along with the remains of the bomb/storage/supply dump and the remains of buildings in the technical site away from the airfield.  Many connecting streets are visible in aerial imagery, however all of the above are clearly worn and decayed by the desert sands.

See also
 No. 462 Squadron RAAF

References

 Maurer, Maurer. Air Force Combat Units of World War II. Maxwell AFB, Alabama: Office of Air Force History, 1983. .

External links
 http://geographic.org/geographic_names/name.php?uni=-4461698&fid=3775&c=libya
 http://wikimapia.org/#lat=31.8424201&lon=24.621048&z=13&l=0&m=b&v=8

Airfields of the United States Army Air Forces in Libya
World War II airfields in Libya
Airports established in 1941